The Ruby Mountains are a mountain range, primarily located within Elko County with a small extension into White Pine County, in Nevada, United States. Most of the range is included within the Humboldt-Toiyabe National Forest. To the east lies Ruby Valley, and to the west lie Huntington and Lamoille Valleys. The Ruby Mountains are the only range of an introduced bird, the Himalayan snowcock, in North America.

The 'Rubies' were named after the garnets found by early explorers. The central core of the range shows extensive evidence of glaciation during recent ice ages, including U-shaped canyons, moraines, hanging valleys, and steeply carved granite mountains, cliffs, and cirques.  All of these features can be seen from 12-mile Lamoille Canyon Road, a National Forest Scenic Byway which traverses Lamoille Canyon, entering the range near the town of Lamoille.

Major features

Major valleys include Lamoille Canyon (and its branches Thomas and Right Fork Canyons), Seitz Canyon, Box Canyon and Kleckner Canyon. Canyons to the north drain into the main stem of the Humboldt River above Elko, while a group of canyons above the Te-Moak tribal lands constitute the headwaters of the South Fork of the Humboldt River.  Major summits in the central core of the range include Ruby Dome, Thomas Peak, Liberty Peak, Mount Fitzgerald, Verdi Peak, Snow Lake Peak, Mount Silliman, and Mount Gilbert.  Prominent peaks further south include King, Lake, Wines, Tipton, and Pearl Peaks.  North of the central core, significant peaks include Old-Man-of-the-Mountain and Soldier Peak.

Glaciers gouged out basins that are now alpine lakes.  The larger of these, all located in the central core of the range, include Echo, Liberty, Favre, Lamoille, Castle, and Griswold lakes, while smaller tarns also in the central core include the scenic Island, Dollar, Verdi, Snow, Box, and Seitz lakes.  Further to the north are Cold, Hidden, Soldier, and Robinson lakes, while to the south are North Furlong and Overland lakes.  Water collected by the southern section of the Rubies seeps into the adjacent Ruby Valley to form the Ruby Lake National Wildlife Refuge.

Ecology

The eastern Great Basin is wetter than the western part in the rain shadow of the Sierra Nevada range.  Moisture collected by this high range promoted the heavy Pleistocene glaciation and still supports a wide variety of flora and fauna.  Lower elevations are covered by aspen trees, while higher up the whitebark and limber pines predominate.  Mountain goats, bighorn sheep, mule deer, mountain lions, marmots, beaver, and pikas are common residents. A population of Himalayan snowcock was introduced from Pakistan, and is thriving among the high cliffs. Streams, particularly on the western slopes have populations of native Lahontan or Humboldt cutthroat trout, but many of these populations are hybridized with rainbow trout or have been displaced by brown and brook trout, all stocked for angling purposes before impacts on native trout species were well understood.

Geology
The Ruby Mountains are part of the Basin and Range Province that formed partly due to extension of the North American plate. Normal faults on the eastern and western flanks of the range separate it from the basins on either side of it. The Ruby Mountains are an example of a metamorphic core complex that formed during the during the Cretaceous-Paleogene time when the oceanic Farallon Plate was subducting underneath the North American plate causing crustal thickening throughout Nevada and Utah. The weight from the thickening crust increased temperatures and pressures up to 40 km at depth and caused regional metamorphism to occur, as well as the formation of some migmatic igneous bodies. During the Oligocene to Eocene, active subduction was no longer occurring and the upper crust relaxed causing the stress to change from compressional to extensional. The extensional force caused the middle and lower crustal rocks to be exhumed to the surface as part of the Basin and Range Province along the footwall of a large detachment fault. A mylonitic shear zone can be traced along the fault on the western margin of the Ruby Mountains, marking the contact between the igneous and metamorphic rocks in the core complex and the undeformed sedimentary rocks around it. Generally deeper rocks are exposed in the northern part of the Ruby Mountains than in the south.

Wilderness area
The higher altitude sections of the range were designated as the  Ruby Mountains Wilderness Area in 1989.  The isolated Seitz and Echo Canyons are further preserved as an ecologically special Research Natural Area.

Principal recreational access can be found at Lamoille and Soldier Canyons on the west side of the range, and at the Overland Lake Trailhead to the east.

References

External links

 U.S. Forest Service
 SummitPost.org

 
Mountain ranges of Nevada
Humboldt–Toiyabe National Forest
Mountain ranges of Elko County, Nevada
Mountain ranges of White Pine County, Nevada
Mountain ranges of the Great Basin